

History
The college was founded in 1992 by Jerry Sherlock, a former film, television, and theatre producer. Originally located at the Tribeca Film Center, NYFA moved to 100 East 17th Street, the former Tammany Hall building in Union Square in 1994. After 23 years of occupancy, the college relocated from Tammany Hall to 17 Battery Place in 2015, where the school currently resides.

Academics
NYFA offers undergraduate and graduate degree programs, certificates, and workshops. It is accredited by the WASC Senior College and University Commission.

NYFA's disciplines of study include filmmaking, Producing, Screenwriting, Cinematography, Digital editing, Documentary Filmmaking, Acting for Film, 3D Animation and Visual Effects, Entertainment Media, Photography, Game Design, Musical Theater and Virtual Reality, as well as an English as a second language program that aims to combine traditional language learning with activities related to the arts. In 2007, NYFA partnered with NBC News to start a program in Broadcast Journalism. In 2010 the contract between NYFA and NBC expired, but the broadcast journalism programs at NYFA continue to be offered by many of the original faculty. NYFA degree programs, workshops, and short-term courses are held around the world. Summer workshops are offered at Harvard University. International locations include Australia, Florence, Paris, Beijing, and Shanghai. Other international locations are offered at various times of the year.

Partnerships
Since 2007, NYFA has collaborated with museums and major art institutions to organize cultural and filmmaking education initiatives for teens and young adults. Since 2010, the New York Film Academy has partnered with the Metropolitan Museum of Art. Working closely with each individual institution, the Film Academy contributes resources in curriculum development, teaching staff, and equipment to deliver programs that teach students the creative art of the moving image, as well as the importance and value of all forms of art and the institutions that preserve, protect and display them. The partnering institutions include:

 Brooklyn Museum, 2007
 Whitney Museum, 2009
Metropolitan Museum of Art, 2010–current
 In 2014, NASA and the New York Film Academy announced a new initiative that would enlist students to create original audiovisual materials to raise awareness about the development of the James Webb Space Telescope as part of the academy's STEAM initiative.
 The New York Film Academy offered a series of ongoing REDucation Workshops in partnership with RED Digital Cinema Camera Company.
 10 ARTS Foundation

NYFA founded 10 ARTS Foundation, a nonprofit organization that offers scholarship and funding opportunities for storytellers. The public can volunteer with the organization, donate to a program or educational project. The 10 ARTS Foundation organization’s mission on their website is this: “We are committed to fostering global creativity that empowes a new generation of aspiring storytellers to connect the world throguh the gift of opportunity.” 

10 ARTS has NYFA Alliances with National Geographic, TheMET, BAFTA, NASA, Variety, The Hollywood Reporter, The Writers Guild Foundation, Warner Brothers, USAID, National Coalition Against Censorshop, The Hilaria & Alec Baldwin Foundation, USO, TEDx, MultiChoice, Alexandra Skiba Memorial Scholarship, Tribeca Film Festival, AT&T, New York Public Library, Inter-American Development Bank, Fulbright, and more. 

The Board of Trustees includes Emmy Award-winning journalist and filmmaker Tony Harris, and pioneering film/TV producer Shkh. Al-Zain S. Al-Sabah, Jack McColgan, and Heidi Wissmiller.

Notable Faculty
NYFA draws faculty who are active, working professionals in their fields, many of whom are award winners or have formerly taught at such prestigious institutions as Tisch School of the Arts, Columbia University, AFI Conservatory, University of Southern California, Stanford University, Harvard University, Yale University and University of California, Los Angeles.
Notable faculty members have included SAG Award-winning actor Matthew Modine, BAFTA Award-winning cinematographer Anthony B. Richmond BSC, ASC, film critic Peter Rainer, actor Bill Duke, writer Heather Hach, director Nag Ashwin, filmmaker Mark Lester, actress Brenda Vaccaro, actor Louis Gossett Jr., actor Mark Olsen, actress and musical theater performer Kristy Cates, director Adam Nimoy, game designer Chris Swain, director Claude Kerven, screenwriter Jim Jennewein, actress Lynda Goodfriend, and actor/director Michael Zelniker.

Notable alumni

 Adinia Wirasti, actress
 Adrian Voo, actor
 Akkineni Naga Chaitanya, actor and producer
 Alanna Masterson, actress
 Alaya Furniturewala, actress
 Alberto Frezza, actor
 Alfonso Ribeiro, actor
 Andrew Bachelor, actor and Internet personality
 Angela Ismailos, director
 Anouar H. Smaine - Film director, producer, writer and actor
 Antonio Chavez Trejo, filmmaker, writer, producer and entrepreneur
 Athiya Shetty, actress
 Aubrey Plaza, actress
 Banky Wellington, rapper and actor
 Bevin Prince, actor
 Bill Hader, actor and screenwriter
 Bita Elahian, actress and filmmaker
 Brittany Andrews, actress, model, and filmmaker
 Camilla Luddington, actress 
 Carter Smith, director and photographer
 Chad Duell, actor
 Chika Anadu, director and screenwriter
 Chord Overstreet, actor
 Damon Wayans, actor and comedian
 Damon Wayans, Jr., actor and comedian
 D. B. Woodside, actor
 Drama Del Rosario, documentarian
 Eamonn Walker, actor
 Elyfer Torres, actor
 Francesco Panzieri, visual effects artist
 Gauri Shinde, Director
 Gerald McMorrow, writer and director
 Gino M. Santos, director and producer
 Giorgio Pasotti, actor
 Greg DeLiso, director
 Hannah Lux Davis, director
 Hannah Quinlivan, actress and model
 Hayden Szeto, actor
 Imran Khan, actor
 Issa Rae, creator
 Jason Shah, actor
 Lal Jr., director and screenwriter
 Jessica Lee Rose, actress
 Joelle Garguilo, journalist
 Jonathan Morgan Heit, actor
 Joshua Leonard, actor
 Julie Tan, actress
 Justine Wachsberger, actor
 Kangana Ranaut, actress
 Kemi Adesoye, screenwriter
 Kendall Ciesemier, reporter and producer
 Kira Hagi, actress
 Kushal Tandon, model and actor
 Lana Condor, actress
 Lea Gabrielle, journalist
 Lio Tipton, model and actress
 Luv Ranjan, producer, screenwriter, and director
 Mahsa Saeidi-Azcuy, participant on The Apprentice
 Maisa Silva, actor and TV presenter
 Mariana Gómez, actress and singer.
 Mariano Di Vaio, actor
 Mariyah Moten, model and pageant queen
 Masali Baduza, actress
 Matty Cardarople, actor
 Mike Pohjola, screenwriter, playwright, novelist
 Mohamed Diab, director and screenwriter
 Nag Ashwin, director
 Nara Rohit, actor
 Natasha Thahane, actress
 Naya Rivera, actress
 Neil Forsyth, screenwriter
 Niharica Raizada, actress
 OC Ukeje, actor
 Omoni Oboli, actress, director, producer, and writer
 Oshri Cohen, actor
 Oskar Kuchera, actor, TV presenter, and radio host
 Paul Dano actor
 Pevita Pearce, actress
 Philip Dorling, screenwriter
 Rafael de la Fuente, actor
 Ragga Ragnars, actress
 Rah Digga, actress and rapper
 Raphaela Neihausen, producer
 Rekha Rana, actress
 Rob Margolies, writer and director
 Rohit Gupta, director 
 Ronen Rubinstein, actor
 Sasha Cohen, actress and figure skater
 Sean Robinson, film director and editor
 Shaquille O'Neal, basketball player and actor
 Sharad Malhotra, actor
 Shehzad Sheikh, actor
 Shirley Setia, singer and actress
 Somy Ali, actress 
 Stephanie Cayo, actress
 Stephanie Okereke Linus, actress
 Tharun Bhascker Dhaassyam, director
 Tracy Oliver, writer, producer, and actor
 Trevor Matthews, producer and actor
 Tushar Tyagi, director
 Vittoria Chierici, artist
 Zoltan Varkonyi, director and actor

References

External links

 

 
Drama schools in the United States
Educational institutions established in 1992
Film schools in New York (state)
Performing arts education in New York City
Universities and colleges in Manhattan
Universities and colleges in Los Angeles County, California
Film schools in California
Film schools in Australia
Drama schools in Australia
Film schools in Florida
Animation schools in the United States
Graphic design schools in the United States
Schools in Los Angeles
Universities and colleges in Los Angeles
Design schools in the United States
Universities and colleges in New York City
Union Square, Manhattan
Private universities and colleges in California
1992 establishments in New York City